Callionymus bentuviai, Ben-Tuvia's deepwater dragonet, is a species of dragonet endemic to the Red Sea.  This species grows to a length of  SL.

References 

B
Fish described in 1981
Taxa named by Ronald Fricke